KRLA King of the Wheels is the debut studio album by The Bobby Fuller Four. It was released by Mustang Records in November 1965 in stereo and mono. It was released in promotion of the local Los Angeles radio station, KRLA.

Background

The album was put out soon after "Let Her Dance" made the top 40 charts locally. Bob Keane wanted a drag racing album, featuring surf instrumentals, covers, and some singles, however, his original vision changed along the way. In the end, four new drag racer songs were recorded for the album. The title track, "King of the Wheels", is a reworking of an earlier Bobby Fuller song, "King of the Beach". "KRLA Top Eliminator" was based on the real-life customized dragster made by KRLA (seen on the cover), and a reworking of a live cover of "El Paso Rock" by Long John Hunter; Fuller's band used to perform in El Paso. In addition, six songs were also taken from his three latest singles (including "Let Her Dance"), and three new songs were recorded ("Fool of Love" and "Saturday Night" were re-recordings of older Bobby Fuller tracks, and "Little Annie Lou" would go on to become a B-side for their next single, "I Fought the Law"). "The Lonely Dragster" is a reworking of the song "Wolfman", a B-side from a previous single, "Thunder Reef".

In 1990, this album was re-released on CD by Ace Records, bundled with I Fought the Law, along with seven bonus tracks (later put out by Del-Fi Records in 1994). In 1992, Repertoire Records reissued this album on CD with fifteen bonus tracks.

Track listing

Bonus tracks

Personnel

The Bobby Fuller Four
 Bobby Fuller – guitar, lead vocals
 DeWayne Quirico – drums
 Jim Reese – guitar, backing vocals
 Randy Fuller – bass guitar, lead and backing vocals

Technical
 Robert Keane – producer

References

1965 debut albums
Albums produced by Bob Keane
The Bobby Fuller Four albums